"Time to Get It Together" is a 1978 song recorded by Marvin Gaye and issued on Marvin's 1978 album, Here, My Dear. Much like "Everybody Needs Love", "Anger" and "A Funky Space Reincarnation", among others, this song doesn't discuss the demise of Marvin's marriage to Anna Gordy Gaye. Instead the song is a biographical account of the singer's own personal demons as he battled drug abuse, paranoia and depression.

Background
The artist admits though he says he's trying to break his habits, he always find himself back in them. In the beginning of the song, Gaye shouts out in a preacher's tone, saying "Jesus said time will heal all wounds/but we have to live right to get the time". As with many of the songs on Here My Dear, "Time to Get It Together" lacks a chorus, but concludes with a vamp in which Gaye mixes his optimism with a depressive tone. He chants in one instance that his days of drug abuse and, as he puts it, "foolin' 'round with midnight hos" were over, and in another harmoniously states "my life's a clock and it's winding down/from the day you're born 'till the day you're in the ground". Gaye used the song's intro as the opening number for his late 1970s/early 1980s concerts, including his performance at the 1980 Montreux Jazz Festival in Switzerland.

Personnel
All vocals, keyboards and synthesizers by Marvin Gaye
Drums by Bugsy Wilcox
Bass by Frank Blair
Guitars by Wali Ali and Gordon Banks
Alto saxophone by Ernie Fields Jr.
Percussion by Gary Jones

1978 songs
Marvin Gaye songs
Songs written by Marvin Gaye
Song recordings produced by Marvin Gaye